Cándido Mauricio Sánchez (5 May 1900 - 16 January 1952) was a Spanish footballer who played as a midfielder.

Club career
Born in Vélez-Rubio, Andalusia, he moved to Catalonia as a child and there he started his career with CF Badalona in 1919 and remained in the team for 5 seasons.      with CE Europa in 1917. Along with the likes of Cros and Alcázar, he was part of the attacking front of the great CE Europa side of the twenties.

International career
As a player of CF Badalona, and later of CE Europa, he was eligible to play for the Catalonia national team, being summoned several times during the 20s. Together with Paulino Alcántara, Josep Samitier and Ricardo Zamora, he was part of the great Catalonia side of the twenties that won the 1926 Prince of Asturias Cup, an inter-regional competition organized by the RFEF.

Honours

International
Catalonia

Prince of Asturias Cup:
Champions (1): 1926

References

1900 births
1952 deaths
Sportspeople from the Province of Almería
Footballers from Andalusia
Spanish footballers
Association football midfielders
CF Badalona players
CE Europa footballers
La Liga players
Catalonia international footballers